The 2015–16 Odense Bulldogs season is the 25th season in the Danish Hockey League since the team was promoted in 1990.

They finished in 5th place in the league with the record 24–18–3 and were picked by 4th-placed Herning Blue Fox for the quarter-finals.

Regular season

League table

Schedule and results

Regular season

Playoffs

Player statistics

Skaters

Goaltenders

References

Sport in Odense